Events from the year 1838 in Spain.

Incumbents
Monarch: Isabella II
Regent: Maria Christina of the Two Sicilies
Prime Minister: 
 until 6 September: Narciso Fernández de Heredia, 2nd Count of Heredia-Spínola
 6 September-9 December: Bernardino Fernández de Velasco, 14th Duke of Frías
 starting 9 December: Isidro de Alaix Fábregas (acting)

Events
June 20–22 - Battle of Peñacerrada
October 1 - Battle of Maella

Births
April 10 - Nicolás Salmerón y Alonso

Deaths
September 1 - Gabriel de Mendizábal Iraeta
Francisco Javier Venegas

See also
First Carlist War

 
1830s in Spain
Years of the 19th century in Spain